Paranoid fiction is a term sometimes used to describe works of literature that explore the subjective nature of reality and how it can be manipulated by forces in power.  These forces can be external, such as a totalitarian government, or they can be internal, such as a character's mental illness or refusal to accept the harshness of the world they are in.

History
The elements of paranoid fiction can be seen in works dating as far back as the late 19th and early 20th century. Some of Fyodor Dostoyevsky's novels contained paranoid and psychologically troubled characters set against the dark backdrop of a modernizing Russia. Franz Kafka, in particular, was known for his exaggerated accounts of what he portrayed as real life in his works, to enhance the absurdity of the life themes they conveyed.  Similarly, George Orwell's works, while not as exaggerated, confirmed the practice of using dystopian fiction to take a different outlook on highly common themes, including identity and personal desires.

The term paranoid fiction was first coined to label sensationalistic and off-beat stories as bizarre and thus outside the realm of literary fiction.  Starting after World War I, however, modernists began exploring the stranger themes of life in art, in response to  the themes of death being effectively mechanized and made impossible to toy with by the war's graphic depictions.  As a result, modernist literature tended to explore the meaning and construction of reality, shifting away from the progressive, cause-and-effect structure of realist fiction towards a more complex and disjointed depiction of reality.

After World War II, absurdists carried this focus one step further by placing these common themes in surreal and fantastic settings, turning what would have been otherwise mundane concepts into distinctive, stand-out ones, thus converting the paranoid fiction genre into a legitimate one.

Philip K. Dick is most frequently viewed as the forefather of the modern paranoid fiction.  His works were born out of paranoia and hallucination; he had sudden visions of places he'd never been to and events he'd never witnessed, possibly from temporal lobe epilepsy or an active imagination.  These visions were so vivid that Dick put them down on paper, never failing to classify them as only "speculative thought," and thus outside the boundary of conventional thought.

Most of Dick's works start out uneventfully in a seemingly ordinary setting, then transpose to a surrealistic fantasy, with the characters discovering that what they thought real was in fact a delusion.  Throughout his works, Dick maintained a balance between the expected traits of the science fiction genre they were also categorized in, and the eccentric and disturbing elements coming from his mind.  A recurring theme in his works is on how reality is perceived and treated differently by people depending on their mindsets.

Characteristics

At its most basic, paranoid fiction refers specifically to works about speculations and possible conspiracies by people in power, told by an unreliable narrator.  However, the most popular type of paranoid fiction has proved to be one in which the universe appears on the surface to be definite and real, but upon closer inspection, to actually be deceptive and deliberately misleading.  In these works, there are either questions raised as to the realness of the world the characters are living in, or a distinction made between a fantasy world and its reality.

Paranoid fiction often overlaps with many other genres, most commonly dystopian fiction, science fiction, and film noir, sharing many of its main themes and literary devices.  Generally, however, paranoid fiction avoids explicitly defined themes and concrete motifs in favor of allegories and ambiguous symbolism to emphasize the dreamlike and unreal nature of the characters' world.  For example, a purely dystopian work typically explores the mechanisms and motives of the totalitarian state to keep its people under control, whereas one of paranoid fiction would concentrate more on the effects of the state on its inhabitants' mental and emotional well-being, and its implications on the decadent condition of society.  George Orwell's Nineteen Eighty-Four can be viewed as a balance of the two, depicting the Party as crushing free will through a strictly defined language and constant monitoring, but also through psychological torture and the distorting of people's viewpoints on what is true and what is false.

To further increase their "magic realism," works of paranoid fiction often employ common devices and archetypes from other genres, including a detective-solving structure, plot twists, or philosophical themes, to create a surrealistic tone and an atmosphere of fear and dread.  Plots also tend to be fanciful and occasionally futuristic to emphasize their inherent absurdity and imaginativeness, but also maintain some measure of realism to comment on how apparently unrealistic stories can, in fact, be (often frighteningly) closer to real life than one might think at first glance.

Sometimes paranoid fiction will strongly imply, and occasionally admit outright, that its constructed world is a lie or an illusion.  In this case, the plot will center on the main character's struggle between the physical and spiritual; i.e. the actual world they are in, versus the world they want to see and believe in. Here, the cause of the fantasy is the protagonist's internal desires, doubts, and suspicions.  Such works tend to be more introspective and focused on the individual, than on a community or a regime.

Authors

 William S. Burroughs
 Philip K. Dick
 H. P. Lovecraft
 Franz Kafka
 Thomas Pynchon
 Kurt Vonnegut
 Fyodor Dostoevsky
 Hunter S. Thompson
 James Kelman
 Samuel Beckett
 Stephen R. Donaldson
 Jean-Paul Sartre
 Stanisław Lem
 Robert Anton Wilson
 Strugatsky brothers
 Trevor Shane
 Jim Thompson
 Dimitris Lyacos - Z213: Exit
 Iain Banks
 Ishmael Reed
 Matt Ruff
 Knut Hamsun
 George Orwell
 Ryū Murakami
 Chuck Palahniuk

Films

12 Monkeys
American Psycho
Angel Heart
A Beautiful Mind
Brazil
The Butterfly Effect
The Devil's AdvocateDonnie DarkoCarnival of SoulsEraserheadFight ClubFriend of the WorldThe GameJacob's LadderLost HighwayThe Manchurian CandidateThe MatrixMelvin Goes to DinnerMulholland DriveNaked Lunch PhantasmPiPrimerThe PrisonerThe MachinistA Scanner DarklyShutter IslandThe Sixth SenseThe Truman ShowSlaughterhouse-FiveSomewhere in Time
Taxi Driver
They Live
Total Recall
Vanilla Sky
Videodrome

See also 
 Biopunk
 Conspiracy fiction
 Dystopian
 Pandemics in fiction

References 

Literary genres
Fiction

Paranoia